York Place is a street in central Edinburgh of almost exclusively 18th century buildings, linking Queen Street to Broughton Street and Leith Walk.

The street's architecture remains almost completely intact but it is one of the busiest streets in the city centre being part of the main east-west route for traffic together with the Edinburgh Trams line and several bus services.

History

York Place was developed as a dual sided street on the north-east edge of Edinburgh's First New Town. The land was purchased by the city from James Erskine, Lord Alva in 1793 and it was joined by the Heriot Trust which also owned land here. Work began immediately and was complete by 1804 (other than the church (see below).

The street is little altered. The only major change has been the demolition of the east side of  Elder Street on the south side including the east corner with York Place, in 1969 (to improve access to the bus station).

In 1888 a tram system was introduced. Originally drawn by underground cables the system was invisible except for the rails and central channel (for the cable). This all changed in 1921 following unification of Edinburgh and Leith (which had electric trams since 1905) when a complex of poles and wires were added, to the severe detriment of the streetscape. These poles and cables were removed in 1956 following the demise of the trams. More conscious of the issue of "street clutter" the planners removed all lamp-posts from the street in the 1970s. The street is lit by high level floodlights mounted at eaves level on the buildings. The clutter of the trams reappeared in 2017 with the Edinburgh Trams project.

Notable Buildings
 St Paul's and St George's Church by Archibald Elliot (built as St Paul's Chapel, 1816)
 St George's Episcopal Chapel by James Adam in 1792 with a new front added in 1934, now in use as a Genting Casino
 7 York Pl - St George's manse, an unusual castellated house immediately east of the chapel (1793 remodelled in 1818 by Alexander Laing for his own use)
 1 to 3 York Place, an exceptional corner block by David Paton featuring three lower commercial floors with more glass than wall
 44 York Place built as a tax office in 1964, remodelled as a Premier Inn in 2018
 72 York Place - Conan Doyle public house - linked to the birthplace of Arthur Conan Doyle 50m eastwards

Notable residents
see

 2 - James Orrock
 6 - Thomas Meik civil engineer
 7 - Alexander Laing (architect)
 10 - David Milne
 10 - William Craig, Lord Craig
 10 - Admiral David Milne and his son Admiral Alexander Milne
 15 - James Bonar WS
 16 - Adam Gillies, Lord Gillies
 19 - John Abercrombie (physician)
 20 - Sir James Montgomery, 2nd Baronet
 21 - James Archer (artist)
 22 - Alexander Irving, Lord Newton
 23 - James Miller (surgeon)
 23 - John Yule (botanist)
 28 - Rev David Dickson
 30 - Alexander Gillespie
 32 - Sir Henry Raeburn artist (as his studio and sales room)
 32 - Colvin Smith, artist
 33 - John Lizars
 35 - Dionysius Wielobycki
 36 - James Scarth Combe
 37 - John Starforth architect
 40 - Alexander Osborne the giant
 43 - John Abercrombie (physician)
 47 - Alexander Nasmyth and his sons James Nasmyth and Patrick Nasmyth
 55 - Andrew Geddes (artist)
 57 - Thomas Hamilton (architect)
 61 - Lady Sinclair of Murkle
 61 - Frederick Hallard, legal author

References

New Town, Edinburgh
Streets in Edinburgh